Sean Maddocks (born 10 April 2002) is an English former professional snooker player. As a 15 year old, he became the youngest snooker player to score a 147 break in competition, beating the previous record held by Ronnie O'Sullivan.

Career 
In January 2020, Maddocks finished as runner-up in the WSF Junior Open, as a result, he was awarded a two-year card on the World Snooker Tour for the 2020–21 and 2021–22.

Performance and rankings timeline

Career finals

Amateur finals: 2

References 

2002 births
Living people
English snooker players
Snooker players from Liverpool